The Saint Paul sports rugby is a French rugby union based in Saint-Paul-lès-Dax (Landes). It plays in the pool 7 Fédérale 3 (5th level of rugby union in France)

History
Club of a borough of Dax, the club was founded the first time in 1909, merged with US Dax, in 1912.
Waa refounded with the name of Saint-Paul-lès-Dax olympique (SPDO) in 1930, as rugby section of an omnisports club. In 1951, the club joined the rugby league before coming back to rugby union in 1955, when it adopted the definitive name of Saint-Paul sports (SPS).

St-Paul obtained its better results in the '90s, when was admitted to Groupe B2 (third level) in 1992, B1 in 1993, and finally in the elite the Groupe A, in 1994. That season (1994-95), plays against the better French club (Castres, Brive, Montferrand, Bourgoin...), but was briefly relegated (only a victory and some big defeated as the 10–74 with encaissé à Nice).
The clun solo come back in the amateurs levels, descending in 2008 in Fédérale 2 (2008) the in Fédérale 3 (2009).
After 2009, when the former player Pierre Cazeaux, the club start a new era.
In 2010–2011, both senior teams of the club reached the finals of their championship.
The first team won the pool, losing the final against Navarrenx, losing the first match 17–12 in Navarrenx, and winning the second only 6–3.
The second team (équipe Excellence B) winning the Challenge of Espoir for 2nd teams winning against Saint Cernin (Cantal) 21–15. .

Palmarès 
 Finalist of French Championship Groupe B2 (third national level) : 1994 (against Châteaurenard)
 Finalist of French Championship Third division : 1981
 "First seriè" champion 1978
 French Champion Third Série : 1972
 Champion of Côte Basque Honneur : 1979
 Winner of challenge Essor II : 1986
 Winner of Challenge of l'Essor : 1990
 Finalist of French Championship Fédérale 1B : 2002 (losing against Nîmes), 2005 (losing against Millau).
 Winner of Challenge of l'Espoir (2nd XV) : 2011
 Finalist of French Championship Excellence B : 2011 (losing against Arcachon)

Famous players 
Many players play in national team:
 Thierry Lacroix, international A
 Pascal Lacroix, international B
 Frédéric Leloir, international B
 Pierre Lupuyau, international B
 Christophe Tournier, international – Under 21
 Arnaud Siberchicot, international – Under 18
 Jérôme Hillotte, international amateur
 Gilles Beguery, international amateur
 Sébastien Boueilh, international amateur
 Franck Espatolero, international amateur
 Loic Boniface, international for Croatia
 Pete McTasty, international for Malaysia

Coaches
 Jean-Marie Capdepuy
 Philippe Dacharry
 Jean Laborde
 Dominique Ducasse
 Pierre Hayet
 Laurent Peducasse
 Guy Postis
 Pascal Roubin
 Frédéric Leloir

Notes and references

External links 
 Official Site
 Fiche du club sur www.itsrugby.fr

French rugby union clubs
Rugby clubs established in 1909